Loop marks are a cutaneous condition, caused by beating with a doubled-over cord. They are perhaps the single most characteristic finding in child abuse.

See also 
 Skin pop scar
 List of cutaneous conditions

References 

Skin conditions resulting from physical factors